Jean-Michel Rossignol is a Canadian special effects makeup artist. He is most noted for his work on the 2020 film Blood Quantum, for which he was a winner alongside Erik Gosselin, Joan-Patricia Parris and Nancy Ferlatte of the Canadian Screen Award for Best Makeup at the 9th Canadian Screen Awards in 2021; however, due to different inclusion rules around special effects makeup, he was not a nominee for the Prix Iris for Best Makeup at the 22nd (B) Quebec Cinema Awards despite that award also having been won by Gosselin, Parris and Ferlatte.

References

External links

Canadian make-up artists
Best Makeup Genie and Canadian Screen Award winners
Special effects people
Living people
Year of birth missing (living people)